Tori Lacey (born 13 May 1973) is a meteorologist and weather presenter who is employed by ITV Granada.

Early life
She was born as Victoria Jane Good in Buckinghamshire and went to Burnham Grammar School (as did Ulrika Jonsson) leaving in 1991, then studied Biomedical Sciences at the University of Bradford from 1992 to 1995.

Career
Lacey joined the BBC Weather Centre in April 2001, with her first broadcast in November 2001. She initially appeared regularly on the BBC News channel.

In early broadcasts, her name appeared as Victoria Good, but she quickly changed this to Tori Good. After marrying, she changed her name to Tori Lacey. BBC Radio Five Live presenter Simon Mayo suggested it made her sound like an X-rated porn star, so she is considering changing her on-screen name to her full married name of Victoria Lacey.

Lacey broadcast her last weather forecast on Friday, 12 June 2009 (12.30 on the Victoria Derbyshire show) prior to going on maternity leave. She returned in mid-2010. She later left the BBC in 2011.

Lacey joined ITV Granada based at MediaCity UK, Salford Quays in February 2023. Lacey is the Hub weekend weather presenter for Calendar, Granada Reports, ITV News Tyne Tees & Lookaround.

Personal life
She married Christopher Lacey in December 2005 in the Chiltern District of Buckinghamshire. She lived in Chalfont St Giles.

References

External links
  Tori Lacey Profile  BBC Weather Website
@VictoriaLaceyTV on Twitter

1973 births
Living people
Alumni of the University of Bradford
BBC weather forecasters
ITV Weather
People educated at Burnham Grammar School
People from Chalfont St Giles